The ABC Under-20 Championship 2000 is the 3rd edition of the International Basketball Federation FIBA Asia's championship for young men basketball. The games were held at Doha from August 22–30, 2000.

Preliminary round

Group A

Group B

Group C

Group D

Quarterfinals

Group I

Group II

Group III

Group IV

Classification 5th–14th

13th place

11th place

9th place

7th place

5th place

Final round

Semifinals

3rd place

Final

Final standing

Awards

Most Valuable Player:  Yasseen Ismail
Best Scorer:  Yasseen Ismail
Best 3-Pointer:  Bang Sung-Yoon
Best Coach:  Choi Bu-Yung

References
 Results

FIBA Asia Under-20 Championship
2000–01 in Asian basketball
2000 in Qatari sport
International basketball competitions hosted by Qatar